Another is a 2012 Japanese adult animated horror television series produced by P.A. Works and directed by Tsutomu Mizushima that aired twelve episodes from 10 January to 27 March 2012. Based on the 2009 novel of the same name by Yukito Ayatsuji, the series is set in 1998 and focuses on a boy named Kōichi Sakakibara who, upon transferring into Yomiyama Middle School and meeting the curious Mei Misaki, finds himself in a mystery revolving around students and people related to his class facing gruesome and senseless deaths. Another was directed by Tsutomu Mizushima and produced by P.A. Works, with character designs by Yuriko Ishii, the chief animation director of the series, based on Noizi Ito's original concepts for the novel.

Another premiered in late-night slots on Kitanihon Broadcasting, TVQ Kyushu Broadcasting, and several independent TV stations, then appeared on Nippon BS Broadcasting beginning in April.

Sentai Filmworks has licensed the anime series for digital and home video release in 2012. An original video animation episode set before the beginning of the series was released on May 26, 2012 with a "0th" volume of the manga.



Episode list

Notes

References

External links

 
 
 . Retrieved 2 June 2018.

Another
2012 anime OVAs
Censored television series
Horror anime and manga
Mystery anime and manga
2010s adult animated television series